The 2017 Louisville Cardinals baseball team represents the University of Louisville during the 2017 NCAA Division I baseball season. The Cardinals play their home games at Jim Patterson Stadium as a member of the Atlantic Coast Conference. They are led by head coach Dan McDonnell, in his eleventh year at Louisville.

Following the conclusion of the regular season, the Cardinals were selected to host their fifth consecutive NCAA Regional. The Cardinals would win both the Louisville Regional and Louisville Super Regional and receive an invitation to the 2017 College World Series before eventually losing to TCU by a score of 3–4. Five players from the team, including Brendan McKay, were selected in the 2017 MLB Draft.

Previous season
In 2016, the Cardinals finished as champions of the Atlantic Coast Conference with a record of 46–10, 22–8 in conference play, in their second season in the conference. They qualified for the 2016 Atlantic Coast Conference baseball tournament, where they played in Division B of inter-conference tournament play. The Cardinals would finish 1–2 in the tournament, not advancing to the conference tournament finals.

With the Cardinals finishing the season as regular season champs of the Atlantic Division of the ACC, they would qualify for the 2016 NCAA Division I baseball tournament, and were selected as hosts of the Louisville regional and Louisville Super Regional, if they advanced to that round. The Cardinals would wins three straight matches in the Louisville Regional and would advance to the Super Regional (of which they were hosts) by defeating Western Michigan 6–1, Ohio State 15–3, and Wright State 3–1. In the Super Regional, Louisville hosted UC Santa Barbara in a best-of-three matchup. Louisville would lose the first two games to UC Santa Barbara, ending their playoff run.

Roster

Schedule

! style="background:#CC0000;color:white;"| Regular Season
|- valign="top" 

|- bgcolor="#ccffcc"
| February 17 || vs.  || #11 || Spectrum Field • Clearwater, FL || W 7–1 || McKay (1–0) || Howe (0–1) || Hoeing (1) || 455 || 1–0 ||
|- bgcolor="#ccffcc"
| February 18 || vs.  || #11 || Spectrum Field • Clearwater, FL || W 10–7 || Sparger (1–0) || Bloom (0–1) || Henzman (1) || 652 || 2–0 ||
|- bgcolor="#ccffcc"
| February 19 || vs.  || #11 || Spectrum Field • Clearwater, FL || W 10–4 || Hummel (1–0) || Marquardt (0–1) || None  || 609 || 3–0 ||
|- bgcolor="#ccffcc"
| February 22 || vs.  || #11 || Jim Patterson Stadium • Louisville, KY || W 19–3 || Martin (1–0) || Ford (0–1) || None || 2,154 || 4–0 ||
|- bgcolor="#ccffcc"
| February 24 ||  || #11 || Jim Patterson Stadium • Louisville, KY || W 7–2 || McKay (2–0) || Murphy (0–2) || None || 1,862 || 5–0 ||
|- bgcolor="#ccffcc"
| February 25 || Omaha || #11 || Jim Patterson Stadium • Louisville, KY || W 10–0 || McClure (1–0) || Binger (1–1) || None || 825 || 6–0 ||
|- bgcolor="#ccffcc"
| February 26 || Omaha || #11 || Jim Patterson Stadium • Louisville, KY || W 6–0 || McAvene (1–0) || Suponchick (0–2) || None || 1,056 || 7–0 ||
|-

|- bgcolor="#ccffcc"
| March 1 ||  || #6 || Jim Patterson Stadium • Louisville, KY || W 20–2 || Sparger (2–0) || Stambaugh (0–1) || None || 929 || 8–0 ||
|- bgcolor="#ccffcc"
| March 3 ||  || #6 || Jim Patterson Stadium • Louisville, KY || W 13–0  || Bennett (1–0) || Mattson (2–1) || None || 936 || 9–0 ||
|- bgcolor="#ccffcc"
| March 4 || Eastern Michigan || #6 || Jim Patterson Stadium • Louisville, KY || W 3–2 || Thompson (1–0) || Feldman (0–2) || None || 1,077 || 10–0 ||
|- bgcolor="#ccffcc"
| March 5 || Eastern Michigan || #6 || Jim Patterson Stadium • Louisville, KY || W 8–7 || Elliott (1–0) || Feldman (0–3) || Sparger (1)  || 3,475 || 11–0 ||
|- bgcolor="#cccccc"
| March 7 || Eastern Kentucky || #5 || Turkey Hughes Field • Richmond, KY ||colspan=7|Postponed
|- bgcolor="#ccffcc"
| March 8 ||  || #5 || Jim Patterson Stadium • Louisville, KY || W 12–2  || Bordner (1–0) || Helm (1–1) || None || 1,084 || 12–0 ||
|- bgcolor="#ccffcc"
| March 10 ||  || #5 || Jim Patterson Stadium • Louisville, KY || W 3–0 || McKay (3–0) || Mitchell (0–2) || Henzman (2) || 995 || 13–0 || 1–0
|- bgcolor="#ccffcc"
| March 11 || Pittsburgh || #5 || Jim Patterson Stadium • Louisville, KY || W 8–2 || McClure (2–0) || Pidich (2–1) || None || 894 || 14–0 || 2–0
|- bgcolor="#ccffcc"
| March 12 || Pittsburgh || #5 || Jim Patterson Stadium • Louisville, KY || W 3–1 || Bennett (2–0) || Falk (2–1) || Henzman (3) || 1,017 || 15–0 || 3–0
|- bgcolor="#ccffcc"
| March 15 ||  || #2 || Jim Patterson Stadium • Louisville, KY || W 13–4 || Martin (2–0) || Astle (1–1) || None || 883 || 16–0 || 3–0
|- bgcolor="#ccffcc"
| March 17 ||  || #2 || Jim Patterson Stadium • Louisville, KY || W 6–0 || McKay (4–0) || Stevens (2–1) || None || 620 || 17–0 || 4–0
|- bgcolor="#ccffcc"
| March 18 || Boston College || #2 || Jim Patterson Stadium • Louisville, KY || W 6–4 || McClure (3–0) || Gill (1–4) || Henzman (4) || 958 || 18–0 || 5–0
|- bgcolor="#ccffcc"
| March 19 || Boston College || #2 || Jim Patterson Stadium • Louisville, KY || W 5–3 || Martin (3–0) || Metzdor (1–3) || Henzman (5) || 968 || 19–0 || 6–0
|- align="center" bgcolor="ffbbb"
| March 21 || at  || #2 || Marge Schott Stadium • Cincinnati, OH || L 3–6 || Kroger (1–0) || McAvene (1–1) || Orndorff (4) || 1,709 || 19–1 || 6–0
|- align="center" bgcolor="ffbbb"
| March 24 || at  || #2 || Doak Field • Raleigh, NC || L 1–3 || Adler (3–2) || McKay (4–1) || O'Donnell (1) || 2,824 || 19–2 || 6–1
|- bgcolor="#ccffcc"
| March 25 || at NC State || #2 || Doak Field • Raleigh, NC || W 7–6 || Henzman (1–0) || Staley (1–1) || None || 3,048 || 20–2 || 7–1
|- bgcolor="#ccffcc"
| March 26 || at NC State || #2 || Doak Field • Raleigh, NC || W 8–1 || Bennett (3–0) || Wilder (0–2) || None || 2,821 || 21–2 || 8–1
|- bgcolor="#ccffcc"
| March 28 ||  || #2 || Jim Patterson Stadium • Louisville, KY || W 11–1 || Hummel (2–0) || Bruner (0–1) || None || 3,294 || 22–2 || 8–1
|- bgcolor="#ccffcc"
| March 31 || at  || #2 || Davenport Field • Charlottesville, VA || W 5–2  || Wolf (1–0) || Harrington (1–1) || Henzman (6) || 2,928 || 23–2 || 9–1
|-

|- align="center" bgcolor="ffbbb"
| April 1 || at  || #2 || Davenport Field • Charlottesville, VA || L 2–11 || Bettinger (4–0) || McClure (3–1) || None || 3,832 || 23–3 || 9–2
|- bgcolor="#ccffcc"
| April 2 || at Virginia || #2 || Davenport Field • Charlottesville, VA || W 4–3 || Wolf (2–0) || Doyle (1–1) || Henzman (7) || 3,736 || 24–3 || 10–2
|- bgcolor="#ccffcc"
| April 4 || Kentucky || #2 || Jim Patterson Stadium • Louisville, KY || W 5–3 || Hummel (3–0) || Thompson (2–2) || Henzman (8) || 6,210 || 25–3 || 10–2
|- align="center" bgcolor="ffbbb"
| April 7 || Wake Forest || #2 || Jim Patterson Stadium • Louisville, KY || L 1–2 || Dunshee (6–1) || McKay (4–2) || Roberts (3) || 2,931 || 25–4 || 10–3
|- bgcolor="#ccffcc"
| April 8 || Wake Forest || #2 || Jim Patterson Stadium • Louisville, KY || W 7–6 || Sparger (3–0) || McCarren (2–3) || Henzman (9) || 3,104 || 26–4 || 11–3
|- bgcolor="#ccffcc"
| April 9 || Wake Forest || #2 || Jim Patterson Stadium • Louisville, KY || W 7–5 || Wolf (3–0) || Roberts (1–1) || Bordner (1) || 4,056 || 27–4 || 12–3
|- bgcolor="#ccffcc"
| April 11 || Purdue || #2 || Jim Patterson Stadium • Louisville, KY || W 13–2 || Hummel (4–0) || Dellinger (1–3) || None || 1,579 || 28–4 || 12–3
|- bgcolor="#ccffcc"
| April 13 || at  || #2 || Russ Chandler Stadium • Atlanta, GA || W 3–0 || McKay (5–2) || Schniederjans (0–2) || Henzman (10) || 1,215 || 29–4 || 13–3
|- bgcolor="#ccffcc"
| April 14 || at Georgia Tech || #2 || Russ Chandler Stadium • Atlanta, GA || W 10–1 || McClure (4–1) || Curry (3–4) || None || 1,220 || 30–4 || 14–3
|- bgcolor="#ccffcc"
| April 15 || at Georgia Tech || #2 || Russ Chandler Stadium • Atlanta, GA || W 5–4 || Wolf (4–0) || Ryan (3–2) || Henzman (11) || 1,358 || 31–4 || 15–3
|- align="center" bgcolor="ffbbb"
| April 18 || at Kentucky || #2 || Cliff Hagan Stadium • Lexington, KY || L 7–11 || Thompson (4–2) || Hummel (4–1) || None || 4,018 || 31–5 || 15–3
|- align="center" bgcolor="ffbbb"
| April 21 ||  || #2 || Jim Patterson Stadium • Louisville, KY || L 3–5 || Stallings (4–3) || McKay (5–3) || Labosky (5) || 1,533 || 31–6 || 15–4
|- bgcolor="#ccffcc"
| April 22 || Duke || #2 || Jim Patterson Stadium • Louisville, KY || W 7–5 || Wolf (5–0) || Ziemba (2–3) || Henzman (12) || 814 || 32–6 || 16–4
|- bgcolor="#ccffcc"
| April 23 || Duke|| #2 || Jim Patterson Stadium • Louisville, KY || W 10–0 || Bennett (4–0) || Day (3–3) || None || 2,158 || 33–6 || 17–4
|- bgcolor="#ccffcc"
| April 25 || at  || #2 || Turkey Hughes Field • Richmond, KY || W 14–4 || Smiddy (1–0) || Carter (0–1) || None || 894 || 34–6 || 17–4
|- bgcolor="#ccffcc"
| April 26 ||  || #2 || Louisville Slugger Field • Louisville, KY || W 6–4 || Wolf (6–0) || Jerger (1–3) || Henzman (13) || 2,729 || 35–6 || 17–4
|- bgcolor="#ccffcc"
| April 28 ||  || #2 || Jim Patterson Stadium • Louisville, KY || W 5–4 || McKay (6–3) || Calhoun (3–3) || Bordner (2) || 950 || 36–6 || 17–4
|- bgcolor="#ccffcc"
| April 29 || Toledo || #2 || Jim Patterson Stadium • Louisville, KY || W 11–1 || McClure (5–1) || Achter (3–4) || None || 1,746 || 37–6 || 17–4
|- bgcolor="#ccffcc"
| April 30 || Toledo || #2 || Jim Patterson Stadium • Louisville, KY || W 17–2 || Sparger (4–0) || Shutes (2–6) || None || 1,852 || 38–6 || 17–4
|-

|- bgcolor="#ccffcc"
| May 2 ||  || #2 || Jim Patterson Stadium • Louisville, KY || W 6–5 || Henzman (2–0) || Mraz (0–2) || None || 1,734 || 39–6 || 17–4
|- bgcolor="#ccffcc"
| May 5 || at  || #2 || Frank Eck Stadium • South Bend, IN || W 2–0 || McKay (7–3) || Bass (2–7) || Henzman (14) || 517 || 40–6 || 18–4
|- bgcolor="#ccffcc"
| May 6 || at Notre Dame || #2 || Frank Eck Stadium • South Bend, IN || W 5–1 || McClure (6–1) || Hearne (3–4) || None || 557 || 41–6 || 19–4
|- bgcolor="#ccffcc"
| May 7 || at Notre Dame || #2 || Frank Eck Stadium • South Bend, IN || W 9–4 || Elliott (2–0) || Guenther (2–1) || None || 828 || 42–6 || 20–4
|- bgcolor="#ccffcc"
| May 9 || Vanderbilt || #2 || Jim Patterson Stadium • Louisville, KY || W 6–2 || Martin (4–0) || Ruppenthal (1–3) || None || 4,120 || 43–6 || 20–4
|- bgcolor="#ccffcc"
| May 12 || Clemson || #2 || Doug Kingsmore Stadium • Clemson, SC || W 4–2 || McKay (8–3) || Barnes (5–4) || Henzman (15) || 4,405 || 44–6 || 21–4
|- bgcolor="#ccffcc"
| May 13 || Clemson || #2 || Doug Kingsmore Stadium • Clemson, SC || W 6–4 || McClure (7–1) || Beasley (1–2) || Wolf (1) || 5,164 || 45–6 || 22–4
|- bgcolor="#ccffcc"
| May 14 || Clemson || #2 || Doug Kingsmore Stadium • Clemson, SC || W 6–4  || Bennett (5–0) || Krall (7–2) || Henzman (16) || 4,572 || 46–6 || 23–4
|- align="center" bgcolor="ffbbb"
| May 16 || Indiana || #2 || Bart Kaufman Field • Bloomington, IN || L 3–4 || Saalfrank (2–1) || Martin (4–1) || None || 3,077 || 46–7 || 23–4
|- align="center" bgcolor="ffbbb"
| May 18 || Florida State || #2 || Jim Patterson Stadium • Louisville, KY || L 9–12 || Voyles (4–0) || Sparger (4–1) || None || 3,487 || 46–8 || 23–5
|- align="center" bgcolor="ffbbb"
| May 19 || Florida State || #2 || Jim Patterson Stadium • Louisville, KY || L 2–8 || Holton (8–2) || McClure (7–2) || None || 3,359 || 46–9 || 23–6
|- bgcolor="#cccccc"
| May 20 || Florida State || #2 || Jim Patterson Stadium • Louisville, KY || colspan=7|Postponed
|-

|-
! style="background:#CC0000;color:white;"| Post-Season
|-

|- bgcolor="#ccffcc"
| May 25 ||  || #4 || Louisville Slugger Field • Louisville, KY || W 10–3 || McKay (9–3) || Hearne (4–5) || None || 6,945 || 47–9 || 23–6
|- align="center" bgcolor="ffbbb"
| May 26 || Florida State || #4 || Louisville Slugger Field • Louisville, KY || L 6–2 || Holton (9–2) || McClure (7–3) || None || 8,843 || 47–10 || 23–6
|-

|- bgcolor="#ccffcc"
| June 2 ||  || #7 || Louisville Slugger Field • Louisville, KY || W 11–6 || Bordner (2–0) || Gerber (4–4) || None || 3,763 || 48–10 || 23–6
|- bgcolor="#ccffcc"
| June 3 ||  || #7 || Louisville Slugger Field • Louisville, KY || W 11–1 || Sparger (5–1) || Irvin (6–3) || None || 4,060 || 49–10 || 23–6
|- bgcolor="#ccffcc"
| June 4 ||  || #7 || Louisville Slugger Field • Louisville, KY || W 8–7 || Henzman (3–0) || Kirschner (4–3) || None || 4,012 || 50–10 || 23–6
|-

|- bgcolor="#ccffcc"
| June 9 || Kentucky || #7 || Louisville Slugger Field • Louisville, KY || W 5–2 || McClure (8–3) || Thompson 8–3 || None || 6,235 || 51–10 || –
|- bgcolor="#ccffcc"
| June 10 || Kentucky || #7 || Louisville Slugger Field • Louisville, KY || W 6–2 || McKay (10–3) || Hjelle (11–4) || Bordner (3) || 6,237 || 52–10 || –
|-

|- bgcolor="#ccffcc"
| June 17 or 18 || Texas A&M || #7 || TD Ameritrade Park Omaha • Omaha, NE || W 8–4 || McKay (11–3) || Martin (7–4) || None || 23,437 || 53–10 || –
|- align="center" bgcolor="ffbbb"
| June 20 || Florida || #7 || TD Ameritrade Park Omaha • Omaha, NE || L 1–5 || Singer (8–5) || McClure (8–4) || None || 22,222 || 53–11 || –
|- align="center" bgcolor="ffbbb"
| June 22 || TCU || #7 || TD Ameritrade Park Omaha • Omaha, NE || L 3–4 || Wymer (6–4) || Bennett (5–1) || – || 24,985 || 53–12 || –
|-

Awards and honors

National / Conference Players of the Week

Award Watch List

Awards

Coaching awards

References

Louisville Cardinals
Louisville Cardinals baseball seasons
Louisville Cardinals baseball
Louisville Cardinals
College World Series seasons